WR 31a, commonly referred to as Hen 3-519, is a Wolf–Rayet (WR) star in the southern constellation of Carina that is surrounded by an expanding Wolf–Rayet nebula. It is not a classical old stripped-envelope WR star, but a young massive star which still has some hydrogen left in its atmosphere.

History of observations 
WR 31a was first published in 1952 as one of six peculiar emission line stars, but not given a designation at that time. It was described as having numerous P Cygni type lines with unusually broad emission components. A year later it was listed as being associated with nebulosity, at the time thought to be a planetary nebula.

In 1976, it was included in a catalogue of southern emission-line stars, the third catalogue of emission objects compiled by Karl Gordon Henize.  The designation , sometimes , was adopted as the most common identifier for this star. In 2001, it was listed in The Seventh Catalogue of Galactic Wolf-Rayet stars as entry 31a, but it is still frequently called .

In 1994, WR 31a was first described as a candidate luminous blue variable (cLBV) after a detailed spectrographic study with the Anglo-Australian Telescope.

It was thought that, if this distance was confirmed by Gaia second data release (DR2) in 2018, this would mean both stars wer much less luminous than previously thought, and both may instead be former red supergiant stars. (2018) calculated its distance to be .

Blue bubble 
The Hubble Space Telescope (HST) has captured a striking image of the nebula, rendering it as a thin blue bubble. In this false colour image, the blue colours represents red visible light (605 nm), while orange-red colours represent near infrared radiation at 814 nm. Some media sources have wrongly claimed this deep-sky object was recently discovered by the HST, but this nebula was originally found by Ellen Dorrit Hoffleit in 1953 and designated as the planetary nebula Hf 39. Other planetary nebula catalogue names include ESO 128-18 and Wray 15-682.

Since 2013, the nebula has been considered not as a planetary nebula, but rather as a much larger expanding gas shell, formally classified as a Wolf–Rayet nebula or WR nebula.

Properties 
WR 31a itself, the highly luminous central star of the nebula, is invisible to the naked-eye at magnitude 10.85V.  It has a spectral classification of WN11h, indicating a WR star with strong N emission but no N emission, and with hydrogen features visible in the spectrum. The spectral classification WN11 was created for this star and AG Carinae since they did not fit into any existing spectral type and appeared to constitute an extension of the WR nitrogen sequence to cooler temperatures. The progenitor's mass of the central star is estimated to have been about 45 times that of the Sun, and this massive star will likely explode as a supernova in the future.

The spectrum of WR 31a shows P Cygni profiles, most strongly on the dominant H, He, and N lines.  These profiles may show dramatic changes on a timescale of weeks, with the absorption components of the lines sometimes disappearing completely.

Variability 
No significant brightness changes have been detected in WR 31a, but it has been listed as a candidate luminous blue variable because of its luminosity, temperature, and mass loss properties. Van Genderen catalogued it as a dormant or ex-LBV because of the lack of characteristic LBV variations. Possible small brightness changes have been seen in All Sky Automated Survey (ASAS) data, WR 31a is included as a variable star in the International Variable Star Index, although not in the General Catalogue of Variable Stars.

References 
 

Wolf–Rayet stars
Carina (constellation)
J10535958-6026444
Luminous blue variables
IRAS catalogue objects